Deh Moghan (also Romanized as Deh Moghān; also known as Daymoqān, Deymoghān, Deymoghū’īyeh, Deymoqū’īyeh, and Moghān) is a village in Ahmadi Rural District, Ahmadi District, Hajjiabad County, Hormozgan Province, Iran. At the 2006 census, its population was 37, in 10 families.

References 

Populated places in Hajjiabad County